Worship dance or liturgical dance take on several forms of sacred dance in Christianity and Messianic Judaism, and is usually incorporated into liturgies or worship services.

Some liturgical dance was common in ancient times or non-Western settings, with precedents in Judaism beginning with accounts of dancing in the Old Testament. An example is the episode when King David danced before the Ark of the Covenant, but this instance is often considered to be outside of Jewish norms and Rabbinic rituals prescribed at the time.

Dance has historically been controversial within Christianity. Many records exist of prohibitions by leaders of most branches of the Christian Church, for such reasons as the association of dance with paganism, the use of dance for sexual purposes, and a Greek-influenced belief in the separation of soul and body. Beginning in the second half of the 20th century, and especially following the Second Vatican Council, there was a significant growth in the use of dance in Christian worship. This received a boost from the charismatic movement of the 1970s, which initiated a transition to contemporary worship in many churches.

A distinctive style of worship dance has developed within Messianic Judaism. Known as messianic dance or davidic dance (for King David), it sometimes incorporates elements of Israeli Folk Dancing.

See also
Dance in mythology and religion
Dancing procession of Echternach

References
 Gagne, Robert, Kane, Thomas, VerEecke, Robert (1999). Introducing Dance In Christian Worship. .
Silberling, Murray (1995). Dancing For Joy - A Biblical Approach To Praise And Worship,

External links

Liturgical dance resources
Liturgical dance resources
History of Dance in Worship
Education in Liturgical Dance

Ritual dances
Sacred dance
Christian worship and liturgy